The Latvian National Badminton Championships is a tournament organized to crown the best badminton players in Latvia. They are held since 1964.

Past winners

References

External links 
 Latvijas čempionātu uzvarētāji

Badminton tournaments in Latvia
National badminton championships
Sports competitions in Latvia
Recurring sporting events established in 1964